Area code 225 is a telephone area code in the North American Numbering Plan (NANP) for the southern part of the U.S. state of Louisiana, which includes the entire nine-parish Baton Rouge metropolitan area. The area code was created in August 1998 in an area code split from area code 504. The area code was Louisiana's third area code, and the first new area code in the state in forty-one years.

The numbering plan area (NPA) comprises the parishes of Ascension, East Baton Rouge, East Feliciana, Iberville, Livingston, Pointe Coupee, St. Helena, St. James, West Baton Rouge and West Feliciana.

On a standard telephone keypad, the numbers 2-2-5 correspond to the letters C-A-J, a nod to the area's Cajun heritage. The area code has become part of the regional identity for the Baton Rouge metropolitan area, to the extent that a local news magazine was named 225, published by Louisiana Business Inc.

Service area
Cities in the numbering plan area include:

 Albany
 Baker
 Baton Rouge 
 Brusly
 Clinton
 Convent
 Denham Springs
 Donaldsonville
 Gonzales
 Greensburg
 Jackson
 Livingston
 Lutcher
 Maurepas
 New Roads 
 Plaquemine
 St. Francisville 
 St. Gabriel
 Springfield
 Walker
 White Castle
 Wilson
 Zachary

See also 
 List of Louisiana area codes

References

External links 

Telecommunications-related introductions in 1998
225
225